Filipe Gabriel Gonçalves Ferreira (born 26 October 1996) is a Portuguese professional footballer who plays for C.F. Os Belenenses as a midfielder.

Club career
Ferreira was born in Bombarral, Leiria District, and joined S.L. Benfica's youth system at the age of 8. On 12 September 2015 he made his senior debut with the reserve side, coming on as a late substitute in a 2–0 home win against Académico de Viseu FC. On 24 November of that year, also in the Segunda Liga and from the bench, he helped the hosts defeat Clube Oriental de Lisboa 2–1 by scoring with 15 minutes left.

On 18 August 2017, 20-year-old Ferreira and teammate João Escoval were sold to NK Istra 1961 from the Croatian First Football League, as Mato Miloš moved in the opposite direction.

References

External links

1996 births
Living people
Sportspeople from Leiria District
Portuguese footballers
Association football midfielders
Liga Portugal 2 players
Campeonato de Portugal (league) players
Casa Pia A.C. players
S.L. Benfica B players
Sertanense F.C. players
S.C. Salgueiros players
C.D. Cova da Piedade players
C.F. Os Belenenses players
Croatian Football League players
NK Istra 1961 players
Norwegian First Division players
Notodden FK players
Portugal youth international footballers
Portuguese expatriate footballers
Expatriate footballers in Croatia
Expatriate footballers in Norway
Portuguese expatriate sportspeople in Croatia
Portuguese expatriate sportspeople in Norway